The Skagerrak-Centered Large Igneous Province (SCLIP), also known as the European-Northwest African Large Igneous Province (EUNWA), and Jutland LIP, is a  (Ma) large igneous province (LIP) centered on what is today the Skagerrak strait in north-western Europe (paleocoordinates  (south of Lake Chad)).

The SCLIP covered an area of at least  and includes the Oslo and Skagerrak grabens, areas in south-western Sweden, Scotland, northern England, and the central North Sea.  The SCLIP erupted at 297±4 Ma.
It produced 228,000 km² of currently exposed volcanic material that can be found in Skagerrak, the Oslo Fjord, central North Sea, North-east Germany; 14,000 km² of sills in Scotland, England, Germany, The Netherlands, and Sweden; and 3,353 km total length of dykes in Scotland, Norway, and Sweden.

Plumes derived from a superplume (or Large Low Shear Velocity Province (LLSVP)) overlay the boundary of the superplume at the core-mantle boundary (CMB).  To test whether the SCLIP met these criteria, Torsvik et al. used a shear-wave tomographic model of the mantle, in which the SCLIP indeed do project down to the margin of the African superplume at the CMB at a depth of 2800 km.
A series of LIPs are associated with the African superplume, of which the SCLIP is the oldest: SCLIP (300 Ma), Bachu (275 Ma), Emeishan (260 Ma), Siberian (250 Ma), and Central Atlantic (200 Ma).  Its possible that these plumes together caused the break-up of Pangaea and therefore play an important role in the supercontinent cycle.

The SCLIP is associated with the Moscovian and Kasimovian stages of the Carboniferous rainforest collapse around 296-310 Ma together with the Siberian Barguzin-Vitim LIP.

See also 
 Avalonia
 List of flood basalt provinces
 Central Atlantic magmatic province, Late Triassic to Early Jurassic igneous province in the area
 Central Skåne Volcanic Province, Early Jurassic to Early Cretaceous igneous province in southern Sweden

References

Bibliography 

 
 
 
 
 

Large igneous provinces
Carboniferous volcanism
Permian volcanism
Geology of Denmark
Geology of England
Geology of the Netherlands
Geology of Norway
Geology of Scotland
Geology of Sweden
Geology of the North Sea
Paleozoic Denmark
Paleozoic England
Paleozoic Netherlands
Paleozoic Norway
Paleozoic Scotland
Paleozoic Sweden
Gzhelian
Asselian